Army of the People may refer to:

People's Liberation Army Ground Force (China)
People's Revolutionary Army (Colombia)
Texian Army
Ukrainian People's Army
Provisional Irish Republican Army

See also
People's Army (disambiguation)